State Road 29 is a north–south road in north-central Indiana.

Route description
The southern terminus of State Road 29 is at U.S. Route 421 and State Road 28 just south of the small town of Boyleston.  Going north, it passes through Michigantown in Clinton County, then along the eastern border of Carroll County where it passes through Burlington.  Its northern terminus is at U.S. Route 24 and U.S. Route 35 on the south side of Logansport.

History
At one time, State Road 29 was much longer, going from Madison in the south to Michigan City in the north; when US 421 was commissioned, it took over much of the route. The original road was laid out in the 1830s and construction on the first road was completed in 1841. It was known as "Michigan Road."

The route from Logansport to Michigan city followed the current US 35. Following US 35's commissioning in Indiana, SR 29 became concurrent with US 35. SR 29's northern terminus was truncated to Logansport by 1955 in favor of US 35.

Major intersections

References

External links

029
Transportation in Clinton County, Indiana
Transportation in Carroll County, Indiana
Transportation in Cass County, Indiana
U.S. Route 421